Warrington North is a parliamentary constituency represented in the House of Commons of the Parliament of the United Kingdom since 2019 by Charlotte Nichols of the Labour Party. It elects one Member of Parliament (MP) by the first past the post system of election.

Constituency profile
The constituency is one of two covering the unitary authority of Warrington, Cheshire, the other being Warrington South. It covers the northern and eastern parts of the town, including Birchwood, Orford, Padgate, Poulton and Woolston, in effect suburbs that are contiguous. It also includes the villages of Burtonwood, Culcheth and Winwick.

It includes half of the historic and industrial town that saw significant economic and population growth in the 20th century. In contrast to Warrington South, workless claimants who were registered jobseekers, constituted in November 2012 a higher proportion than the national average of 3.8% of the population, at 4.3%; this demonstrated marginally higher employment than in the North West as a whole, based on a statistical compilation by The Guardian.

Creation 
The constituency was created for the 1983 general election following the major reorganisation of local authorities under the Local Government Act 1972, which came into effect on 1 April 1974. It comprised parts of the abolished constituencies of Newton and Warrington.

Boundaries

1983–1997: The Borough of Warrington wards of Bewsey, Burtonwood, Croft, Culcheth and Glazebury, Fairfield, Howley, Hulme, Longford, Orford, Poulton-with-Fearnhead North, Poulton-with-Fearnhead South, Rixton and Woolston, Whitecross, and Winwick.

Comprised the majority of the abolished Warrington constituency, together with parts of Newton, including Poulton, Winwick and Woolston.

1997–2010: The Borough of Warrington wards of Bewsey, Burtonwood, Culcheth, Glazebury and Croft, Fairfield, Hulme, Locking Stumps, Gorse Covert and Risley, Oakwood, Orford, Poplars, Poulton North, Poulton South, Rixton and Woolston, and Winwick.

Under the Fourth Periodic Review of constituencies, the number of constituencies in Cheshire was increased from 10 to 11 and parts of Warrington South were now included in the newly created constituency of Weaver Vale. To compensate for this loss, the town centre area was transferred from the constituency to Warrington South.

2010–present: The Borough of Warrington wards of Birchwood, Burtonwood and Winwick, Culcheth, Glazebury and Croft, Fairfield and Howley, Orford, Poplars and Hulme, Poulton North, Poulton South, Rixton and Woolston, and Westbrook.

The current boundaries were introduced at the 2010 general election, following the Fifth Periodic Review. Minor changes due to revision of ward boundaries.

Political history
Its first member of Parliament was Doug Hoyle, who had first won the Warrington seat in a by-election in 1981, beating Roy Jenkins, the leader of the then-new Social Democratic Party, in its first election. Hoyle stood down at the 1997 general election and was replaced by Helen Jones, who held the seat from then until the 2019 general election, when she chose to stand down. The seat was then held for Labour by Charlotte Nichols, albeit with a significantly reduced majority.

Although 2010 saw a 6.6% swing from the Labour Party to the Conservative Party, all of its majorities until 2019 were not thought marginal and therefore Warrington North was until then considered a safe seat for the Labour Party, who have selected all of the winning candidates for MP since the constituency's creation.

Members of Parliament

Elections

Elections in the 2010s

Elections in the 2000s

Elections in the 1990s

Elections in the 1980s

See also 

 List of parliamentary constituencies in Cheshire
History of parliamentary constituencies and boundaries in Cheshire

Notes

References

Parliamentary constituencies in Cheshire
Constituencies of the Parliament of the United Kingdom established in 1983
Politics of Warrington